Waverley station is an MBTA Commuter Rail station in Belmont, Massachusetts. It serves the Fitchburg Line. It is located below grade in Waverley Square in the triangle of Trapelo Road, Lexington Street, and Church Street in western Belmont.

History

The Fitchburg Railroad opened through Belmont on December 20, 1843, but no station stop at Waverley Square existed until about 1860. Service on the Central Massachusetts Railroad, which ran parallel to the Fitchburg, began in 1881. The two railroads had separate station buildings, both of which remained in use until somewhat after both railroads were consolidated under the Boston and Maine Railroad (B&M). The tracks originally ran through the square at grade, with level crossings of Trapelo Road and Lexington Street. In August 1951, the town approved an agreement with the state and the B&M for a $1.125 million state-funded project to lower the tracks  to eliminate the crossings. The work was completed in 1952, at which timeCentral Mass Branch trains were moved from their parallel tracks onto the Fitchburg main. All service to Waverley and nearby Belmont Center station ended in 1958.

Service to Belmont Center and Waverley resumed on March 4, 1974. The Central Mass Branch had been discontinued in 1971, so all service was on the South Acton (now Fitchburg) Line. The station building was gone by 1977. Weekend service was discontinued at the two stops on January 30, 1981 as part of general cutbacks, but restored on December 6, 1993.

As part of budget cuts, in 2015, the MBTA was considering an option to shutter the current Waverley station and/or Belmont Station(s) due to expenses related to costs for making Waverley ADA-accessible.  Plans to combine both stations have been outlined in previous studies as early as 2005. Such works as the Fitchburg Commuter Rail Line Improvement Implementation Plan, released in September 2005 have considered this plan.
Other past proposals for altering the station, and in the process raising revenue have included building above the trench style station with a five-story mixed retail and residential development.

References

External links

MBTA – Waverley
Station from Lexington Street from Google Maps Street View

Belmont, Massachusetts
MBTA Commuter Rail stations in Middlesex County, Massachusetts
Railway stations in the United States opened in 1860